Mohamed Mounir (28 October 1988, Salé, Morocco), known as Gnawi, L'Gnawi or Simo Gnawi is a Moroccan rapper. 

Gnawi was arrested on 1 November 2019 and later charged with "offending" public officials and public bodies over a video in which he insults the Moroccan police. His imprisonment has been criticized by the human right organisation Amnesty International.

Career
Mohamed Mounir was born and raised Salé, Morocco. In 2008, he started to rap with the band Larmy Sla (Army of Salé). The name of the band was inspired from Mounir's service in the Moroccan army.

On 29 October 2019, Mounir released the track "3acha cha3b (Long Live the People)" together with Yahya Semlali (Lz3er) and Youssef Mahyout (Weld L'Griya). The song's music video received 13 million views on Youtube two weeks after its release. The song criticizes the Moroccan authorities and indirectly makes a derogatory reference to the Moroccan king.

Arrest
Two days after the release of 3acha cha3b song, on 1st of November 2019 Gnawi was arrested and sentenced to one year of prison for "insulting the police". Police says that the charges are unrelated to the song, pointing out the other two rappers involved have not been arrested. "This trial has nothing to do with freedom of expression. This is a penal code matter," police lawyer Abdelfattah Yatribi said in court.

Amnesty International released a statement criticizing Gnawi's sentencing, stating: "The verdict is disgraceful, and there can be no justification for imprisoning the Moroccan rapper Gnawi for a year simply because he exercised his right to freedom of expression. Expressing peaceful criticism of the police or the authorities is not a crime. International law protects the right to freedom of expression – even when the opinions shared are shocking or offensive. This verdict sends a clear message that the Moroccan authorities will not hesitate to clamp down on people who freely speak their minds and indicates that those who dare to openly criticize the authorities will face punishment".

Discography
 "Chti Dib" – Did you see the wolf? (May 2017)
 "Ta7arouch" – Harassment (December 2018)

References

Living people
1988 births
Moroccan rappers
People from Salé